Gabriel Espinas (born January 3, 1982) is a Filipino professional basketball player for the Batang Kankaloo – Caloocan of the Pilipinas Super League. A 6'4" forward, he was drafted fifth overall by the Beermen in the 2006 PBA draft. He made a name in the amateur ranks as the first-ever Rookie of the Year-Most Valuable Player of the NCAA while playing for the PCU Dolphins.

Amateur career
Espinas began to play for PCU in the NCAA in the 2004 season. With Espinas, Robert Sanz, Jayson Castro, and Ian Garrido playing together with head coach Loreto Tolentino, the Dolphins made it to the Final Four for the first time since 2002.

After defeating the defending champion Letran Knights, PCU defeated the UPHSD Altas in the finals with Espinas scoring double-double numbers in the Final Four and the championship series.

He became the first NCAA player to be named as the Rookie of the Year and the Most Valuable Player in the same season. San Beda's Sam Ekwe followed suit in the 2006 season.

From 2005–06, he led the Dolphins to the finals only to lose to Letran and San Beda, respectively. However, he was still named to the Mythical Five in both seasons.

He debuted in the Philippine Basketball League in 2005 for the Harbour Centre Portmasters playing alongside Mark Cardona, LA Tenorio, Magnum Membrere, and PCU teammates Castro and Sanz.

After a stint with Harbour, he played his final two conferences with the Hapee-PCU squad, leading them to the semifinals in the Heroes Cup.

Professional career
In the 2006 PBA Draft, Espinas was drafted fifth overall by the San Miguel Beermen. After his time with PCU, he was quickly signed by San Miguel to a rookie contract. He made his PBA debut in a game against Red Bull and played an impressive performance despite the loss.

He then played the reserve role for the Beermen after the team acquired the services of Rommel Adducul and Lordy Tugade plus the return from injury of Danny Ildefonso.

The San Miguel Beermen traded Espinas for the Air21 Express' first round pick in the 2008 PBA draft.

He was then traded by the Air21 Express to the Red Bull Barako for a first round pick in the 2009 PBA Draft. The pick was then used to draft Japeth Aguilar as the first overall in 2009 by the Whoopers.

In 2009, he was again traded to the Sta. Lucia Realtors, his fourth team, for Sta. Lucia's 2009 first round pick.

In 2012, he was traded to the Alaska Aces in exchange for Jay-R Reyes.

On March 14, 2015, he was traded to GlobalPort Batang Pier in exchange for Nonoy Baclao and a 2017 first round draft pick.

On April 6, 2015, Espinas was traded back to the Beermen as part of a 4-team, 6-player trade.

PBA career statistics

Correct as of October 4, 2016

Season-by-season averages

|-
| align="left" | 
| align="left" | San Miguel
| 47 || 9.9 || .519 || .000 || .582 || 2.9 || .4 || .2 || .3 || 3.6
|-
| align="left" | 
| align="left" | Magnolia / Air21
| 20 || 9.2 || .412 || .143 || .643 || 1.7 || .3 || .2 || .2 || 2.6
|-
| align="left" | 
| align="left" | Red Bull / Barako Bull
| 33 || 27.9 || .482 || .212 || .634 || 8.4 || 1.2 || .4 || .5 || 12.4
|-
| align="left" | 
| align="left" | Sta. Lucia
| 37 || 20.3 || .516 || .000 || .616 || 5.3 || .7 || .2 || .4 || 7.2
|-
| align="left" | 
| align="left" | Meralco
| 32 || 31.1 || .487 || .000 || .691 || 8.6 || 1.2 || .4 || .7 || 12.1
|-
| align="left" | 
| align="left" | Meralco
| 34 || 27.8 || .465 || .500 || .643 || 6.8 || .9 || .4 || .6 || 11.2
|-
| align="left" | 
| align="left" | Alaska
| 54 || 17.6 || .515 || .000 || .673 || 4.0 || .6 || .1 || .3 || 7.5
|-
| align="left" | 
| align="left" | Alaska
| 43 || 24.5 || .538 || .000 || .628 || 6.7 || 1.1 || .4 || .2 || 10.2
|-
| align="left" | 
| align="left" | Alaska / GlobalPort / San Miguel
| 32 || 11.8 || .573 || .000 || .620 || 2.3 || .4 || .2 || .1 || 3.7
|-
| align="left" | 
| align="left" | San Miguel
| 47 || 14.3 || .540 || .500 || .689 || 3.4 || .5 || .2 || .2 || 5.4
|-class=sortbottom
| align="center" colspan=2 | Career
| 379 || 19.3 || .504 || .220 || .646 || 5.0 || .7 || .3 || .3 || 7.6

Personal life

Espinas was born to an African-American father, who was once stationed in Subic but died when Gabby was only five years old, and to a Filipina mother.

References

External links
 Espinas boosts stock, gets NCAA Player of Week award
 Gameface.ph Hardcore Five of 2005
 Gameface.ph Hardcore Five of 2006

1982 births
Living people
Alaska Aces (PBA) players
Barako Bull Energy players
Basketball players from Zambales
Filipino men's basketball players
Filipino people of African-American descent
Meralco Bolts players
PCU Dolphins basketball players
NorthPort Batang Pier players
Philippine Basketball Association All-Stars
Power forwards (basketball)
San Miguel Beermen players
Sportspeople from Olongapo
Sta. Lucia Realtors players
Maharlika Pilipinas Basketball League players
San Miguel Beermen draft picks